The Bible Belt is a region of the Southern United States in which socially conservative Protestant Christianity plays a strong role in society. church attendance across the denominations is generally higher than the nation's average. The region contrasts with the religiously diverse Midwest and Great Lakes, and the Mormon corridor in Utah and southern Idaho.

Whereas the states with the highest percentage of residents identifying as non-religious are in the West and New England regions of the United States (with Vermont at 37%, ranking the highest), in the Bible Belt state of Alabama it is just 12%, and Tennessee has the highest proportion of evangelical Protestants, at 52%. The evangelical influence is strongest in northern Georgia, Tennessee, Alabama, Mississippi, North Carolina, southern and western Virginia, West Virginia, the Upstate region of South Carolina, and East Texas.

The earliest known usage of the term "Bible Belt" was by American journalist and social commentator H. L. Mencken, who in 1924 wrote in the Chicago Daily Tribune: "The old game, I suspect, is beginning to play out in the Bible Belt." In 1927, Mencken claimed the term as his invention. The term is now also used in other countries for regions with higher religious doctrine adoption.

In the United States

Geography 
The name "Bible Belt" has been applied historically to the South and parts of the Midwest, but is more commonly identified with the South. In a 1961 study, Wilbur Zelinsky delineated the region as the area in which Protestant denominations, especially Southern Baptist, Methodist, and evangelical, are the predominant religious affiliations. The region thus defined included most of the Southern United States, including most of Texas and Oklahoma, and in the states south of the Ohio River, and extending east to include central West Virginia and Virginia, from the Shenandoah Valley southward into Southside Virginia and North Carolina. In addition, the Bible Belt covers most of Missouri and Kentucky and southern parts of Illinois, Indiana, and Ohio. On the other hand, areas in the South which are not considered part of the Bible Belt include heavily Catholic Southern Louisiana, central and southern Florida, which have been settled mainly by immigrants and Americans from elsewhere in the country, and overwhelmingly Hispanic South Texas. A 1978 study by Charles Heatwole identified the Bible Belt as the region dominated by 24 fundamentalist Protestant denominations, corresponding to essentially the same area mapped by Zelinsky.

According to Stephen W. Tweedie, an Associate Professor Emeritus in the Department of Geography at Oklahoma State University, the Bible Belt was viewed in terms of numerical concentration of the audience for religious television when he first published his research in 1995. He finds two belts: one more eastern that stretches from Florida, (excluding Miami, Tampa and South Florida), through Alabama, Tennessee, Kentucky, Georgia, the Carolinas, and into Southside Virginia; and another concentrated in Texas (excluding El Paso, and South Texas), Arkansas, Louisiana, (excluding New Orleans and Acadiana), Oklahoma, Missouri (excluding St. Louis), Kansas, and Mississippi.  "[H]is research also broke the Bible Belt into two core regions, a western region and an eastern region. Tweedie's western Bible Belt was focused on a core that extended from Little Rock, Arkansas, to Tulsa, Oklahoma. His eastern Bible Belt was focused on a core that included the major population centers of Virginia and North Carolina.

A study was commissioned by the American Bible Society to survey the importance of the Bible in the metropolitan areas of the United States. The report was based on 42,855 interviews conducted between 2005 and 2012. It determined the 10 most "Bible-minded" cities were Knoxville, Tennessee; Shreveport, Louisiana; Chattanooga, Tennessee; Birmingham, Alabama; Jackson, Mississippi; Springfield, Missouri; Charlotte, North Carolina; Lynchburg, Virginia; Huntsville-Decatur, Alabama; and Charleston, West Virginia. A study by the Pew Research Center in 2016 found that the ten most religious states were Alabama, Mississippi, Tennessee, Louisiana, Arkansas, South Carolina, West Virginia, Georgia, Oklahoma and North Carolina.

By state

Other Bible Belts in the United States 

In addition to the South, there is a smaller Bible Belt in West Michigan, centered on the heavily Dutch-influenced cities of Holland and Grand Rapids. Christian colleges in that region include Calvin College, Hope College, Cornerstone University, Grace Christian University, and Kuyper College. Much like the South, West Michigan is generally fiscally and socially conservative.

There is also a Bible Belt in the western suburbs of Chicago (especially in DuPage County), centered on Wheaton. Christian colleges in that region include Wheaton College, North Central College, Northern Baptist Theological Seminary, and Elmhurst College. Christian publishing houses in that region include Good News Publishers, Intervarsity Press, and Tyndale House. Carol Stream is home to the headquarters of Christianity Today.

Colorado Springs, Colorado could be considered a Bible belt due to the large amount of prominent evangelical organizations headquartered there including Focus on the Family, Compassion International, The Navigators, David C. Cook, Young Life, Biblica, and others, even though it has low church attendance compared to other Bible belts.

History
During the colonial period (1607–1776), the South was a stronghold of the Anglican church. Its transition to a stronghold of non-Anglican Protestantism occurred gradually over the next century as a series of religious revival movements, many associated with the Baptist denomination, gained great popularity in the region.

The northern colonial Bible Belt (especially New England with its Puritan heritage) frequently performed missionary work in the South. "The centre of Particular Baptist activity in early America was in the Middle Colonies. In 1707 five churches in New Jersey, Pennsylvania, and Delaware were united to form the Philadelphia Baptist Association, and through the association they embarked upon vigorous missionary activity. By 1760 the Philadelphia association included churches located in the present states of Connecticut, New York, New Jersey, Pennsylvania, Delaware, Virginia, and West Virginia; and by 1767 further multiplication of churches had necessitated the formation of two subsidiary associations, the Warren in New England and the Ketochton in Virginia. The Philadelphia association also provided leadership in organizing the Charleston Association in the Carolinas in 1751."

An influential figure was Shubal Stearns: "Shubael Stearns, a New England Separate Baptist, migrated to Sandy Creek, North Carolina, in 1755 and initiated a revival that quickly penetrated the entire Piedmont region. The churches he organized were brought together in 1758 to form the Sandy Creek Association". Stearns was brother-in-law of Daniel Marshall, who was born in Windsor, Connecticut and "is generally considered the first great Baptist leader in Georgia. He founded Kiokee Baptist Church, the oldest continuing Baptist congregation in the state". Also, Wait Palmer, of Toland, Connecticut, may have influenced African American Christianity in the South: "The Silver Bluff, South Carolina, revival was a seminal development, whose role among blacks rivalled that played by the Sandy Creek revival of the Separate Baptists, to which it was indirectly related. It was probably the same Wait Palmer who had baptized Shubal Stearns in 1751 who came to Silver Bluff in 1775, baptizing and constituting a church. Abraham Marshall, who encouraged the later offshoots, was a Separate Baptist of the Sandy Creek school. The revival at the Silver Bluff plantation of George Galphin (some twelve miles from Augusta, Georgia) had brought David George to the Afro-Baptist faith and had provided a ministry for George Liele".

According to Thomas P. Kidd, "As early as 1758, Sandy Creek missionaries helped organize a slave congregation, the Bluestone Church, on the plantation of William Byrd III, which may have been the first independently functioning African American church in North America. The church did not last long, but it reflected the Baptists' commitment to evangelizing African Americans". According to Gayraud S. Wilmore, "The preaching of New England Congregationalists such as Jonathan Edwards about the coming millennium, and his conviction that Christians were called to prepare for it, reached the slaves through the far-ranging missionary work of white evangelists such as Shubal Stearns, Wait Palmer, and Matthew Moore - all of whom left Congregationalism and became Separatist Baptist preachers in the plantation country of Virginia, North and South Carolina, and Georgia".

Buckle

Several locations are occasionally referred to as "the Buckle of the Bible Belt":
Abilene, Texas, a city of 117,000, is home to three Protestant universities: the Baptist affiliated Hardin-Simmons University, the Church of Christ's Abilene Christian University, and Methodist founded McMurry University.
Nashville, Tennessee, sometimes referred to as "the Protestant Vatican", has over 700 churches, several seminaries, and a number of Christian schools, colleges and universities, including Belmont University, Trevecca Nazarene University, Lipscomb University, Free Will Baptist Bible College and American Baptist College. Nashville is the seat of the National Baptist Convention, USA, the headquarters of the Southern Baptist Convention, the National Association of Free Will Baptists, the Gideons International, the Gospel Music Association, and Thomas Nelson, the world's largest producer of Bibles. 
Tulsa, Oklahoma, is a city where Protestant and, in particular, Southern Baptist, the Word of Faith movement, and other evangelical Christian traditions are very prominent. Tulsa is home to Oral Roberts University, Phillips Theological Seminary, and RHEMA Bible Training College (in the suburb of Broken Arrow). A number of prominent Protestant Christians have lived or studied in Tulsa, including Joel Osteen, Kenneth E. Hagin, Carlton Pearson, Kenneth Copeland, Billy Joe Daugherty, Smokie Norful and Billy James Hargis. Tulsa is also home to a number of vibrant Mainline Protestant congregations. Some of these congregations were founded during the oil boom of the early twentieth century and their facilities are noted for striking architecture, such as the art deco Boston Avenue Methodist Church and First Presbyterian Church of Tulsa.  The metropolitan area has at least four religious radio stations (KCFO, KNYD, KXOJ, & KPIM), and at least two religious TV stations (KWHB & KGEB).
Greenville, South Carolina, is a city where many Baptist churches, particularly Independent Baptist, are located. There are more than one hundred Baptist churches in the Greenville area, as well as Bob Jones University. It also is the home of WTBI radio station which plays old-fashioned Christian music and preaching 24 hours a day.

Political and cultural context
Evangelical Protestantism in recent decades links to social conservatism. In 1950, President Harry S. Truman told Catholic leaders he wanted to send an ambassador to the Vatican. Truman said the leading Democrats in Congress approved, but they warned him, "it would defeat Democratic Senators and Congressmen in the Bible Belt."

In presidential elections, the Bible Belt states of Alabama, Mississippi, South Carolina, and Texas have voted for the Republican candidate in all elections since 1980; Oklahoma has supported the Republican presidential candidate in every election since 1968, with Republicans having carried every county in the state in all presidential elections since 2004. Other Bible Belt states have voted for the Republican presidential candidate in the majority of elections since 1980, but have gone to the Democratic candidate either once or twice since then. However, with the exception of Mississippi, historical geographer Barry Vann shows that counties in the upland areas of the Appalachians and the Ozarks have a more conservative voting pattern than the counties located in the coastal plains.

Outside the United States

Australia
In Australia, the term "Bible Belt" has been used to refer to areas within individual cities, which have a high concentration of Christian residents usually centralized around a megachurch, for example:
 Formerly, the northwestern suburbs of Sydney focusing on The Hills District were traditionally known as the "bible belt", where Hillsong Church is located. Between the 2011 and 2016 census, however, the Christian population of The Hills district got reduced by 18.5% and those without a religion grew from 1 in 8 in 2006 to 1 in 5 in the 2016 census.
The Greater Western Sydney area, typically in the City of Fairfield area, in the suburbs between Fairfield and Horsley Park, where the megachurches are St Hurmizd Church, an Assyrian Church of the East and the Apostle Chaldean Catholic Church, a Chaldean Catholic church. Other bible belts include those with high Anglo-Saxon Protestant populations found in the Sutherland Shire, parts of City of Penrith, Camden Council and the Wollondilly Shire.
 The outer-eastern suburbs of Melbourne, where CityLife Church, Crossway Baptist Church, Stairway Church and Discovery Church are located.
 The northeastern suburbs of Adelaide focusing on Paradise, Modbury and Golden Grove, where Influencers Church is located
 The southeastern region of Queensland comprising the towns of Laidley, Gatton and Toowoomba.
 The Brisbane southern suburbs of Mansfield, Springwood, Carindale and Mount Gravatt.  Garden City Assembly of God church, Citipointe Church, Clark Taylor's Worship Centre, and Brisbane Hillsong are notable megachurches in this area.
In 2017 the far northern suburbs of Perth were forming this reputation, with the focus being on One Church and Globalheart in the suburbs of Merriwa and Joondalup respectively.

Toowoomba city in Queensland has long been regarded as fertile ground for Christian fundamentalist right-wing movements  that adhere to biblical literalism, particularly those within the Pentecostal and charismatic stream of Christianity.  This was exemplified by the highly publicised rise and subsequent fall of Howard Carter and the Logos Foundation in the 1980s. The Logos Foundation and other similar movements that have followed it, operate in a controlling, authoritarian and almost cultish manner, contributing to their notoriety. Other similarly conservative Pentecostal churches within the city have, since that time, banded together into a loose federation known as the Toowoomba Christian Leaders' Network. (note - most traditional church denominations have their own, separate ecumenical group) This network views itself as having a divine mission to 'take the city for the Lord' and as such, endorses elements of religious right-wing political advocacy, such as the Australian Christian Lobby (ACL).

ACL's former managing director who was raised in the Logos Foundation and is a former Toowoomba City councillor is Lyle Shelton.  These church groups are strongly associated with North American trends such as the New Apostolic Reformation, Dominion theology, Five-fold ministry thinking, Kingdom Now theology and revivalism.  They support the achievement of a type of theocratic society where conservative and literal interpretations of the bible are the dominant drivers of government, education, the Arts, the media and entertainment. Churches involved in this group currently include the successor organization to the Logos Foundation, the Toowoomba City Church, along with the Range Christian Fellowship, Spring Street Assembly of God, Christian Outreach Centre, Hume Ridge Church of Christ, Revival Ministries of Australia Shiloh Centre, the Edge Christian Centre and many others.

Queensland, just like the American Deep South, is considered to be a major centre for not just biblical groups, but also the homeland of a disproportionate amount of Australia's right-wing and far-right leaning politicians, including but not limited to, Fraser Anning, Pauline Hanson, and Clive Palmer.

Canada
The province of Alberta has been referred to as Canada's Bible Belt with a significant Catholic, Anabaptist population and other Protestants. Certain areas of Canada's east coast region, such as the province of New Brunswick, also contain significant populations of Catholic, Baptist, Anglican and United faith adherents, up to 85% overall. There is also a vast Bible belt across southern Manitoba.

Denmark
In Denmark, rural western Jutland in particular is considered to be the Bible Belt.  This is due to the higher number of citizens who are associated (in this particular area) with conservative Lutheran Christian organisations such as the Church Association for the Inner Mission in Denmark, which traditionally have had a very strong resistance to abortion and LGBT rights. Today, the movement is strongest around Hedensted, Løsning, Korning and Øster Snede. The Danish Oasis Movement, the YMCA and Jehovah's Witnesses are also active in the area. The Evangelical Lutheran Free Church is active in Løsning and the Adventists in Vejle.

Estonia
Census results show religious belief in the country is more prevalent in the east running from north to south along the border with Russia, particularly in those areas with large populations of Russian Orthodox, Estonian Orthodox and Orthodox Old Believers.

Finland
In North Ostrobothnia, Lapland and Northern Savonia, the influence of the Laestadian movement, a Finnish Lutheran revival, is particularly strong. In South Ostrobothnia and Swedish-speaking Ostrobothnia, the influence of awakenism and evangelicalism (evankelisuus) is strong, as is that of the Free Church. The Finnish Bible Belt has been described on the basis of various indicators, but there is no precise definition. Mika Gissler of the THL has identified the medical districts of the Ostrobothnian regions as the Bible zone, which have distinguished themselves in the long term by a lower number of abortions than the rest of the country. Perho in Central Ostrobothnia is the most Lutheran municipality in Finland. Church membership in Ostrobothnia is also more common than in the rest of the country. Voting of Christian Democrats in 2019 parliamental elections was most common in Larsmo and Parkano.

France 
Brittany has a long Catholic tradition, and the church has historically played an important role in the region's cultural and social life. Today, the region is known for its many religious festivals and processions, as well as its numerous churches, chapels, and shrines. Another region with a strong Catholic tradition is the Vendée, which is located in western France. The Vendée has a long history of resistance to anti-clericalism and anti-Catholicism, dating back to the French Revolution.

Germany
An area in Erzgebirge in Saxony has been described as the "Saxon Bible Belt" with a notable evangelical Protestant/Christian fundamentalist/free church community, as well as some conservative Lutheran parishes that are opposed to same-sex marriage. Nevertheless, the Evangelical-Lutheran Church of Saxony approved church resolutions regarding the issue regardless of opinions within those parishes.

Lithuania
Among its Baltic neighbors Lithuania is in general much more religious, but even in this context, Vilnius with its many churches and adjacent region (Vilnius district and Šalčininkai district municipalities) with larger number of Lithuanian Poles is the most religious region of Lithuania. Both Šalčininkai and Vilnius district municipalities by the ruling Electoral Action of Poles in Lithuania – Christian Families Alliance were declared as guarded and ruled by Jesus Christ.

Mexico 
In Mexico, there is what is known as the Rosary Belt (Spanish: Cinturón del Rosario). The term, created by journalist and writer Carlos Monsiváis in 1999, refers to a region comprising the states of Aguascalientes, Guanajuato, Jalisco, Querétaro and, in more recent years, Zacatecas, where 90% of the population professes Roman Catholicism, which has a notable influence on local politics and society. Guanajuato, for example, is one of the most important electoral strongholds of the National Action Party, of Christian Democrat tradition, mostly inspired by the Social Doctrine of the Church, and with strong conservative ideals. It was in this region where the first uprisings against the government took place during the Cristero War, demanding an end to the persecution of Catholics in the country as a result of the promulgation of the so-called Calles Law, which restricted Catholic worship in Mexico.

Netherlands
The Bible Belt of the Netherlands (Dutch: Bijbelgordel) stretches from Zeeland, through the West-Betuwe and Veluwe, to the northern parts of the province Overijssel. In this region, orthodox Calvinists prevail.

New Zealand
In New Zealand, Mount Roskill, Auckland, contains the highest number of churches per capita in the country, and is the home of several Christian political candidates. The electorate was one of the last in the country to go "wet", in 1999, having formerly been a dry area where the selling of alcohol was prohibited.

At the 2013 New Zealand census, the Mangere–Otahuhu local board area of Auckland had the highest concentration of Christians in New Zealand, with 67.7 percent of the local board's 71,000 residents identifying as such.

In contrast to other bible belts, both areas tend to vote for left-wing candidates and are both currently represented in parliament by the governing centre-left Labour Party.

Norway
The Bible Belt of Norway is located mainly in the western and southern parts of the country, especially rural areas of Agder and Rogaland counties, which contains numerous devout Lutherans.

Poland
South and East parts of Poland are much more religious than North and West. See Poland A and B.

Soviet Union
Before its independence, Soviet Ukraine was known as the Bible Belt of the Soviet Union, with a significant proportion of Baptists.

Sweden
The area normally called the Bible Belt of Sweden is centered on Jönköping in southern Sweden and contains numerous free churches. Of the Småland counties, Jönköping is characterised by the Free Church, Kalmar by the High Church and Kronoberg by the Old Church. In a broader sense, the Bible Belt refers to the area between Jönköping and Gothenburg.

There are also numerous conservative Lutheran Laestadians in the Torne valley area in the far north of the country.

United Kingdom

In Northern Ireland, the area in County Antrim stretching from roughly Ballymoney to Larne and centred in the area of Ballymena is often referred to as a Bible Belt. This is because the area is heavily Protestant with a large evangelical community. From 1970 to 2010, the MP for North Antrim was Ian Paisley, a Free Presbyterian minister well known for his theological fundamentalism. The town of Ballymena, the largest town in the constituency, is often referred to as the "buckle" of the Bible Belt.

See also

Banana Belt
Blue wall
Born again
Christian fundamentalism
Christian right
Conservative holiness movement
Cow belt 
Deep South
Evangelicalism in the United States
Great Awakening
Jesusland map
List of belt regions of the United States
List of U.S. states by religiosity
Quran Belt
Rust Belt
Southern Baptist Convention
Unchurched Belt

References

Further reading

 Balmer, Randall H. (2002). Encyclopedia of Evangelicalism. Westminster John Knox Press.
  Brunn, Stanley D., Gerald R. Webster, and J. Clark Archer. "The Bible Belt in a changing south: Shrinking, relocating, and multiple buckles." Southeastern Geographer 51.4 (2011): 513-549. online
 Christine Leigh H, (1997), Southern Cross: The Beginnings of the Bible Belt. Knopf.
 Denman, Stan. (2004). Political Playing for the Soul of the American South: Theater and the Maintenance of Cultural Hegemony in the American Bible Belt. Southern Quarterly, 42(3), 64–72.
 Hayes, Turner Elizabeth. (1997). Women, Culture and Community: Religion and Reform in Galveston 1880–1920, Oxford University Press.
 Heatwole, Charles A. (1978). The Bible Belt; a problem of regional definition. Journal of Geography, 77, 50–55.
 Hill, Samuel S., Lippy, Charles H. & Wilson, Charles R. (2005). Encyclopedia Of Religion In The South. Mercer University Press.
 Lippy, Charles, H. (1993). Religion in South Carolina. University of South Carolina.
 Marsden, George M. (1982). Fundamentalism and American Culture: The Shaping of Twentieth-Century Evangelicalism, 1870–1925. Oxford University Press.
 Moran, Jeffrey P. (2004). The Scopes Trial and Southern Fundamentalism in Black and White: Race, Region, and Religion. Journal of Southern History, 70(1), 95.
 Park, Chris C. (1994). Sacred Worlds: An Introduction to Geography and Religion. Routledge.
 Pettersson, Thorleif & Hamberg, Eva M. (1997). Denominational Pluralism and Church Membership in Contemporary Sweden. Journal of Empirical Theology, 10(2), 61–78.
 Sparks, Randy J. (2001). Religion in Mississippi. University Press of Mississippi for the Mississippi Historical Society.
 Stacey, Williams A. & Shupe, Anson. (1984). Religious Values and Religiosity in the Textbook Adoption Controversy in Texas, 1981. Review of Religious Research. 25(4), 321–333.
 Tweedie, Stephen W. (1978). Viewing the Bible Belt. THE Journal of Popular Culture, 11(4), 865–876.

1920s neologisms
Cultural regions
Christianity in the United States
Evangelicalism in the United States
Christian fundamentalism
Religion in the Southern United States
Regions of the Southern United States
Belt regions of the United States
Cultural regions of the United States
Conservatism in the United States
Social conservatism
History of religion in the United States